Hugh Gough may refer to:

Hugh Gough, 1st Viscount Gough (1779–1869), British Army officer
Hugh Gough, 3rd Viscount Gough (1849–1919)
Hugh Gough, 4th Viscount Gough (1892–1952)
Hugh Henry Gough (1833–1909), British general
Hugh Gough (bishop) (1905–1997), 7th Archbishop of Sydney, 1959–1966
Hugh Gough (harpsichord maker) (1916–1997), English-American harpsichord maker
Hugh Sutlej Gough (1848–1920), British Army officer and Lieutenant Governor of Jersey
Hugh Roumieu Gough, British architect